Walter C. Kelly (October 29, 1873 – January 6, 1939) was a vaudeville comedian and actor. 

He was born in Mineville, New York. He was the elder brother of Jack Kelly (Olympic Gold Medalist and father of actress Grace Kelly) and Pulitzer Prize-winning playwright George Kelly. Kelly toured for years as The Virginian Judge, and was sometimes credited as Walter "Judge" Kelly.

Although Kelly did a number of different Southern dialects playing the various characters in his "Virginian Judge" sketches, an Irish flavor sometimes sneaked through. In one such sketch where three men appear before the Judge for "disturbin' the peace and quarrelin' on the highway", the word "highway" came through as very Irish. Most of his sketches, however, were racist humor at the expense of African-Americans, which reflected his personal feelings. For instance, in 1908 Bert Williams and George Walker, then starring in the successful Broadway production Bandanna Land, were asked to appear at a charity benefit by George M. Cohan. Kelly protested and encouraged the other acts to withdraw from the show rather than appear alongside black performers; only two of the acts joined Kelly's boycott.  Kelly released five recordings of his act on Victor Records and also appeared in several Broadway productions himself.

He brought his signature  role to the movies in the 1935 Paramount film The Virginian Judge. His other movie acting roles include Guns' Costello" in Seas Beneath (1931); "Dan McFadden" in McFadden's Flats (1935); "Judge Calhoun Davis" in The Virginia Judge (1935); "Capt. Zack Livermore" in Tugboat Princess (1936); and "Pat Kelly" in Laughing Irish Eyes (1936).

His autobiography, Of Me I Sing: An Informal Autobiography, was published in 1953. He was also the author of a 1935 short story, "The Virginian Judge", which served as the basis for the 1935 movie.

On December 8, 1938, Kelly was struck by a car in Hollywood, California.  He was taken to Philadelphia, Pennsylvania, where he died on January 6, 1939, from the injuries he sustained.

References

1873 births
1939 deaths
Vaudeville performers
American male comedians
Comedians from New York (state)
Kelly family
Road incident deaths in Pennsylvania
People from Essex County, New York